Minnie Marx (born Miene Schönberg, 9 November 1864 – 13 September 1929) was the mother and manager of the Marx Brothers, a family of vaudevillains, Broadway and film actors and was also the sister of comedian and vaudeville star Al Shean.

Early life
Marx was born Miene Schönberg in Dornum, Germany. Her parents Fanny née Salomons (1829–April 10,1901) and Levy "Lafe" Schönberg (1823–1919) were members of the local Jewish community. Her mother was a yodeling harpist, her father a ventriloquist. Her younger brother, Abraham Elieser Adolf, the future "Al Shean," was born in 1868.

 
About 1880 the family immigrated to New York City, where Minnie married Samuel "Frenchie" Marx in 1884.

Her son Manfred died in infancy in 1886. Her other children were Leonard Joseph (born 1887), Adolph (1888), Julius (1890), Milton (1892) and Herbert (1901), who would grow up to perform as the Marx Brothers.

Career
While managing the Marx Brothers, she went under the name of Minnie Palmer, so that booking agents would not know that the agent representing the Marx Brothers was their mother. She played the harp.

All the brothers confirmed that Minnie Marx had been the head of the family and the driving force in getting the troupe launched, the only person who could keep them in order, and a hard bargainer with theatre managements. As a tribute to her, all the brothers' daughters were given names that began with 'M': Chico with Maxine; Harpo with Minnie; and Groucho with Miriam and Melinda. Gummo and Zeppo had no daughters.

Minnie lived long enough to see her sons' 1929 film debut in The Cocoanuts, but died later that year of a stroke.

Death
Marx died from a stroke on September 13, 1929, at age of 64. She was survived by her husband Sam, sons Chico, Harpo, Groucho, Gummo and Zeppo Marx, grandchildren Maxine, Arthur, and Miriam, sisters Sarah and Hänne and brothers Al (who outlived her by twenty years) and Harry. She was buried at Mount Carmel Cemetery in Glendale, Queens. When her husband died four years later, he was buried next to her.

In popular culture
Marx and some of her sons appear briefly as characters in Glen David Gold's novel Carter Beats the Devil; the narrative identifies her as Minnie Palmer, and only gradually offers clues that the struggling vaudeville act traveling with her are the later-famous Marx Brothers. Marx (played by Shelley Winters) was also the main character in the stage musical Minnie's Boys.

References

External links

 Family - The Marx Brothers
 

1864 births
1929 deaths
19th-century German Jews
German emigrants to the United States
Marx Brothers